Oniscidae is a family of woodlice, including the common woodlouse Oniscus asellus. Six genera are certainly placed in the family (Oniscus, Oroniscus, Phalloniscus, Rabdoniscus, Rodoniscus and Sardoniscus), with eight others included by some sources (Cerberoides, Diacara, Exalloniscus, Hanoniscus, Hiatoniscus, Hora, Krantzia and Tasmanoniscus).

References

External links

Woodlice
Crustacean families